The AWA Royal Rumble Championship is a professional wrestling championship in the South African professional wrestling promotion Africa Wrestling Alliance, contested in an over-the-top-rope battle royal style match held every December at AWA's Coca-Cola Royal Rumble show, usually involving up to 21 participants. It was founded in December, 1995 during the AWA's first year in existence when they were still known as the Africa Wrestling Federation. The current champion is Vinnie Vegas, who won the title on 9 December 2000.

Title history

See also
Africa Wrestling Alliance

References

External links
Official African Wrestling Alliance Website

Africa Wrestling Alliance championships
Professional wrestling battle royales